Linda Johnsen-Holmeide (born 1 December 1972) is a Norwegian sport wrestler.

She won a bronze medal at the 1992 World Wrestling Championships in Villeurbanne, and a bronze medal at the 1993 World Wrestling Championships in Stavern.

References

1972 births
Living people
Norwegian female sport wrestlers
World Wrestling Championships medalists
20th-century Norwegian women